Hector Macpherson may refer to:

 Hector Macpherson Sr. (1875–1970), Canadian-American agricultural economics professor and politician
 Hector Macpherson Jr. (1918–2015), American dairy farmer and politician in Oregon, son of Hector Macpherson Sr.
 Hector C. Macpherson (1851–1924), Scottish journalist, historian, and writer
 Hector Macpherson (astronomer) (1888–1956), Scottish clergyman and astronomer, son of Hector C. Macpherson